Solvent Violet 13, also known as D&C Violet No.2, oil violet, Solvent Blue 90, Alizarine Violet 3B, Alizurol Purple, Duranol Brilliant Violet TG, Ahcoquinone Blue IR base, Quinizarin Blue, Disperse Blue 72, and C.I. 60725, is a synthetic anthraquinone dye with bright bluish violet hue. It is a solid insoluble in water and soluble in acetone, toluene, and benzene. Its chemical formula is C21H15NO3, and its structure is 1-hydroxy-4-(p-tolylamino)anthraquinone, or 1-hydroxy-4-[(4-methylphenyl)amino]-9,10-anthracenedione or 1-hydroxy-4-(4-methylanilino)anthraquinone.

Solvent Violet 13 is used to dye hydrocarbon products like solvents and petrol, thermoplastics, synthetic resins, e.g. polystyrenes, and synthetic fiber. It is also used in cosmetics, e.g. in hair and skin care products. In pyrotechnics, it is used in some violet colored smoke compositions.

References

Solvent dyes
Anthraquinone dyes
Phenol dyes
Anilines